Joseph J. Palackal, C.M.I. (born in Palackal family at Pallippuram, near Cherthala in Alappuzha, Kerala) is an Indic musicologist, singer and composer, with special interests in the musical traditions of the Indian Christians. He is also the Founder-President of the Christian Musicological Society of India.

Research
Palackal wrote a Master's thesis at Hunter College in 1995 on the various styles of singing the Puthenpaana [New Song], the Malayalam poem composed by the grammarian and lexicographer Johann Ernst Hanxleden (Arnos Paathiri), analysing the several cultural influences.

He wrote a doctoral thesis in ethnomusicology at the Graduate Center of the City University of New York in 2005 on Syriac (Aramaic) chant traditions in South India, studying on the one hand the contemporary practice of model melodies of the East-Syriac/Chaldean rite of the Syro-Malabar Church, and, on the other hand, the oktoechos of the West Syriac Rite of the Oriental Orthodox Churches of South India.

As part of this doctoral work, Palackal brought out a CD, Qambel Maran, a collection of Syriac chants in the Chaldean tradition of the Syro-Malabar Church; it includes the hymn Awun d'wasmayya, i.e., the Lord's Prayer in Aramaic, arguably in the same words which were used by Jesus when he taught the Pater Noster, compositions by St. Ephrem the Syrian (notably the acrostic hymn Iso maaran m'siha on the name Iso M'siha, i.e., Jesus the Messiah), and the Syriac translation Sabbah lesan of the Latin hymn Pange Lingua by St. Thomas Aquinas; these chants had up to then been preserved in the main only in oral tradition; among the singers is Fr. Abel Periyappuram, the founder of the Kalabhavan and the key in the transition of the Syro-Malabar liturgy from Syriac (Aramaic) to Malayalam.

Professional work

Vocal works
Palackal is the lead vocalist for about 30 works in Malayalam, Hindi, Sanskrit, English, and Aramaic (Syriac).
He brought out in 1979 an LP record, Christian Bhajans, as part of an experiment under the aegis of Mar Cardinal Joseph Parecattil to devise a liturgy founded on the Indian musical tradition. Another work is a semi-classical rendering of the Sanskrit poem Kristhusahasranaamam [The Thousand Names of Christ] by the engineer and philologist I. C. Chacko, Illiparambil. He made his New York debut in 1990 with a guest appearance singing a Christian devotional song in Hindi in the off-Broadway show Nunsense; later performance venues include Lincoln Center for the Performing Arts and Princeton University.

Publications
Palackal published several research papers on music in English and Malayalam. As a consequence, he was invited to write articles on Indian Christian music in the New Grove Dictionary of Music and Musicians and in the Garland Encyclopedia of World Music; neither encyclopaedia had dealt with the topic before.

He also published illustrations of various facets of their music, culture, and history; these include
the picture of an angel playing a five-stringed violin as carved on the wooden altar of St. Mary's Forane Church, Pallippuram, the iconic portrait of Christ the Guru drawn by Joy Elamkunnapuzha, and the picture of the granite Cross(c. 700 A. D.) at St. Thomas Mount, Chennai, the earliest available material evidence for a flourishing Christian community in India.

Other achievements
As composer, Palackal and George Thaila, commissioned by the Syro-Malabar Church, created music for the English Solemn High Mass in the Chaldean rite.

In an attempt to illumine the heritage of the Indian Christians, Palackal conceived and produced the documentary film Kerala: the Cradle of Christianity in South Asia.

Palackal studied Hindustani classical music (vocal) under N. V. Patwardhan, graduating from the Maharaja Sayajirao University of Baroda; he holds degrees in Christian theology and psychology, the latter with a Gold medal from the Faculty of Arts of M. S. University, and held a National Merit Scholarship. He was, for a time, Dean of Studies at the Kalabhavan under Fr. Abel.

He also founded Nadopasana (1986), a society for the promotion of Indian classical and choral music, at Upasana Centre, Thodupuzha.

Personal
Palackal hails from the family of Palackal Thoma Malpan, the senior founder of the Carmelites of Mary Immaculate, a monastic order which has served as a vessel to preserve many of the musical traditions of Indian Christianity, and grew up in the musical traditions of the Syro-Malabar Church. He lives in New York City.

Further reading
Home page at the Christian Musicological Society of India

References

Living people
Indian musicologists
Ethnomusicologists
21st-century Indian male classical singers
Hindustani singers
Syro-Malabar Catholics
Malayali people
Singers from Kerala
People from Alappuzha district
Maharaja Sayajirao University of Baroda alumni
Graduate Center, CUNY alumni
Hunter College alumni
Educators from Kerala
Year of birth missing (living people)